The 1987–88 Iowa Hawkeyes men's basketball team represented the University of Iowa as members of the Big Ten Conference. The team was led by second-year head coach Tom Davis and played their home games at Carver-Hawkeye Arena. They finished the season 24–10 overall and 12–6 in Big Ten play to finish tied for third place. The Hawkeyes received an at-large bid to the NCAA tournament as #5 seed in the West Region. After defeating Florida State in the first round and UNLV in the second round, they lost to #1 seed Arizona in the Sweet Sixteen.

Roster

Schedule/results

|-
!colspan=9 style=|Non-Conference Regular Season

|-
!colspan=9 style=|Big Ten Regular Season

|-
!colspan=9 style=|NCAA Tournament

Rankings

Awards and honors
Ed Horton – First-team All-Big Ten, Big Ten Rebounding Leader

Team players in the 1988 NBA Draft

Overall, five players from this team were selected in the NBA Draft.

References

Iowa Hawkeyes
Iowa
Iowa Hawkeyes men's basketball seasons
Hawkeyes
Hawkeyes